Cellere is a  (municipality) in the Province of Viterbo in the Italian region of Latium, located about  northwest of Rome and about  northwest of Viterbo.

History
Cellere is mentioned for the first time in the 8th century AD, although a Roman origin has been speculated, under the name. Later it was part of the Papal States and of the Duchy of Castro, then again, until 1870, of the Papal States.

References

External links
 Official website

Cities and towns in Lazio